Nichke-Say is a village in Jalal-Abad Region of the country Kyrgyzstan. It is part of the Toktogul District. Its population was 2,279 in 2021.

References
 

Populated places in Jalal-Abad Region